The Battle of Penghu was a naval battle fought in 1683 between the Qing dynasty and the Kingdom of Tungning. The Qing admiral Shi Lang led a fleet to attack the Tungning forces in Penghu. Each side possessed more than 200 warships. The Tungning admiral Liu Guoxuan was outmaneuvered by Shi Lang, whose forces outnumbered him three to one. Liu surrendered when his flagship ran out of ammunition and fled to Taiwan. The loss of Penghu resulted in the surrender of Zheng Keshuang, the last king of Tungning, to the Qing dynasty.

Prelude

Kangxi Emperor of the Qing dynasty assigned Yao Qisheng as Viceroy of Fujian in 1678. Yao Qisheng assisted Kangxi Emperor to execute the Sea Ban order: "Not even a plank is allowed to enter the water." until 1683, to weaken their economy so cut off all the connection of trade with Tungning Kingdom. By 1683, Kangxi Emperor had stopped all attempts at negotiation with Tungning. Yao Qisheng also recommended Shi Lang as the commander-in-chief of the Qing navy, then Kangxi Emperor agreed and sent Admiral Shi Lang with a force of about 21,000 men and 240 warships to invade Tungning. Shi Lang attempted to attack Penghu before a major hurricane would strike but was driven back by Liu Guoxuan. After the hurricane, Shi Lang regrouped his forces and was ready to strike again.

Battle

Shi Lang divided his force into several smaller fleets. Most of them were sent to attack Liu and his Penghu defence fleet. However a small detachment was sent to go around the battle and land directly on the island where Liu's base was located. Liu was prepared for this and positioned archers and cannons on the beaches, followed by troops to stop the Qing advance.

A few days before the battle, Shi Lang had bought cannons from the Dutch and so his ships were better armed. On July 12, 1683, Qing naval forces took Hujing Island and Tongpan Island in the early stages of the battle. During the battle, the Qing forces smashed into Liu's force and broke up his formation. The defenders still fought bravely. The Qing ships were larger, better armed, and had more ammunition and within an hour, most of the Tungning ships were at the bottom of the ocean. However the remaining ships continued to fight.

In the end, the Tungning ships ran out of ammunition but hand-to-hand combat still continued. When his flagship and commander Liu ran out of ammunition, the remaining ships surrendered, some of them burning for three days and nights. Many generals and soldiers refused to surrender but rather chose to drown as a show of loyalty to the former Ming dynasty, thus ending the battle.

Land battle

As the battle at sea raged on, Qing soldiers rushed ashore under the cover of cannon fire. The defenders used their cannons and arrows to stop the Qing forces but there were simply too many. Led by several skilled generals, the Qing forces broke through Liu's defenses and attacked his base. The victorious Qing forces burnt it down and raised the Qing flag on the highest flagpole.

Aftermath

After surrendering, Liu was about to commit suicide, but he was stopped by Shi Lang. They had a brief talk about the battle and Liu was released. With the destruction of Liu's fleet, Penghu surrendered and Tungning soldiers deserted in droves. It became obvious to the Tungning royal court that they were now defenceless. A few days later, Zheng Keshuang and his court formally surrendered to the Qing dynasty, ending the Kingdom of Tungning.

See also
 Taiwan under Qing rule

Notes

Bibliography
 Wong, Young-tsu (2017) China’s Conquest of Taiwan in the Seventeenth Century: Victory at Full Moon. Springer. 

Kingdom of Tungning
Conflicts in 1683
1683 in China
1683 in Taiwan
Taiwan under Qing rule
Penghu
Penghu